Rumford Center is an unincorporated village in the town of Rumford, Oxford County, Maine, United States. Rumford Center had a post office until September 28, 2002.

References

Villages in Oxford County, Maine
Villages in Maine